NISA Investment Advisors (NISA) is an American asset management firm headquartered in Clayton, Missouri.

History 

The predecessor of NISA was National Investment Services of America, an investment management firm based in Milwaukee, Wisconsin. In 1994, National Investment Services of America split up into three separate entities. Jess Yawitz and Bill Marshall who were employees there founded one of the three separate entities, NISA Investment Advisors. Prior to this both of them were faculty members of Olin Business School at Washington University in St. Louis who then moved to New York City to work at Goldman Sachs. When the firm started it had 20 employees and had $3.9 billion in assets under management. Originally NISA remained in Milwaukee but later moved to Clayton.

In 2017, Marshall and Yawitz sold their ownership stakes in the firm to senior management. Marshall and Yawitz retired from their roles of managing the firm in 2018 and at the end of 2021 respectively. David Eichhorn who was with firm since 1999, was selected to succeed them as CEO of the firm.

NISA is 100% employee-owned.

References

External links 
 

Companies based in St. Louis County, Missouri
Companies established in 1994
Financial services companies established in 1994
Financial services companies of the United States
Investment management companies of the United States
1994 establishments in Wisconsin